Terminalia catappa is a large tropical tree in the leadwood tree family, Combretaceae, native to Asia, Australia, the Pacific, Madagascar and Seychelles. Common names in English include country almond, Indian almond, Malabar almond, sea almond, tropical almond, beach almond and false kamani.

Description
The fruit are corky and light, and dispersed by water. As the tree gets older, its crown becomes more flattened to form a spreading, vase shape. Its branches are distinctively arranged in tiers. They are dry-season deciduous; before falling, they turn pinkish-reddish or yellow-brown, due to pigments such as violaxanthin, lutein, and zeaxanthin. 

The trees are monoecious, with distinct male and female flowers on the same tree. Pollen grains measure about 30 microns.

The species epithet is based on its Malay name Ketapang.

Distribution and habitat
The tree has been spread widely by humans, so the native range is uncertain. It has long been naturalised in a broad belt extending from Africa to northern Australia and New Guinea through southeast Asia and Micronesia into the Indian subcontinent. More recently, the plant has been introduced to parts of the Americas. Until the mid-20th century, the tree had been used extensively in Brazilian urban landscaping, since being a rare case tropical deciduous, their fallen leaves would give a "European" flair to the street. This practice is currently abolished, and the "amendoeiras" are being replaced by native, evergreen trees.

Cultivation and uses
T. catappa is widely grown in tropical regions of the world as an ornamental tree, grown for the deep shade its large leaves provide. The fruit is edible, tasting slightly acidic. The seeds are edible raw or cooked when ripe and the source of its 'almond' common names, but are small and difficult to extract.

The wood is red and solid, and has high water resistance; it has been used in Polynesia for making canoes. In Tamil, almond is known as nattuvadumai.

The leaves contain several flavonoids (such as kaempferol or quercetin), several tannins (such as punicalin, punicalagin or tercatin), saponines and phytosterols. Due to this chemical richness, the leaves (and the bark) are used in different herbal medicines for various purposes. For instance in Taiwan, fallen leaves are used as an herb to treat liver diseases. In Suriname, an herbal tea made from the leaves has been prescribed against dysentery and diarrhea. The leaves may contain agents for prevention of cancers (although they have no demonstrated anticarcinogenic properties) and antioxidants, as well as anticlastogenic characteristics. Extracts of  have shown activity against Plasmodium falciparum chloroquine (CQ)-resistant (FcB1) and CQ-sensitive (HB3) strains.

Keeping the leaves in an aquarium may lower the pH and heavy-metal content of the water. It has been used in this way by fish breeders for many years, and is active against some parasites and bacterial pathogens. It is also believed to help prevent fungus forming on the eggs of the fish.

Gallery

References

External links
 
 Indian almond leaves- Website devoted to Indian almond leaves in folk medicine, modern medicine and aquariums
More Ketapang Info- Blog on ketapang leaves

catappa
Flora of Madagascar
Flora of Seychelles
Flora of tropical Asia
Flora of China
Flora of Taiwan
Flora of the Southwestern Pacific
Flora of Queensland
Flora of the Northern Territory
Taxa named by Carl Linnaeus